Staudtia is a genus of plant in family Myristicaceae. It contains the following species (but this list may be incomplete):
Staudtia pterocarpa (Warb.) Warb.
Staudtia stipitata (Warb.) Warb.

References

Myristicaceae
Myristicaceae genera
Taxonomy articles created by Polbot